2664 may refer to:

 2-6-6-4, a Whyte notation classification of steam locomotive
 2664 Everhart, a minor planet
 NS-2664, an anxiolytic drug
 2664 AD/CE in the 27th century